Blairsville is an unincorporated community in Clermont County, in the U.S. state of Ohio.

History
Blairsville was named for John M. Blair, who started a brick factory there in the 1870s.

References

Unincorporated communities in Clermont County, Ohio
Unincorporated communities in Ohio